In geometry, the midpoint theorem describes a property of parallel chords in a conic. It states that the midpoints of parallel chords in a conic are located on a common line.

The common line (segment) for the midpoints is also called the diameter of a conic. For a circle, ellipse or hyperbola the diameter goes through its center. For a parabola the diameter is always perpendicular to its directrix and for a pair of intersecting lines the diameter goes through the point of intersection.

References 
 David A. Brannan, David Alexander Brannan, Matthew F. Esplen, Jeremy J. Gray (1999) Geometry Cambridge University Press , pages 59–66
 Aleksander Simonic (November 2012) "On a Problem Concerning Two Conics". In: Crux Mathematicorum, volume 38(9) pages 372–377
 C. G. Gibson (2003) Elementary Euclidean Geometry: An Introduction. Cambridge University Press  pages 65–68

External links 
Locus of Midpoints of Parallel Chords of Central Conic passes through Center at the Proof Wiki
midpoints of parallel chords in conics lie on a common line - interactive illustration

Conic sections
Theorems in plane geometry